The Somaliland Police, officially the Somaliland Police Force is a body responsible for law enforcement in the Republic of Somaliland.

History

Establishment 

The Somaliland Police Force was established during the British colonial period and was responsible for the internal security of the Somaliland Protectorate. They also handled permits and permits such as identity cards and passports.

Overview

The Somaliland Police falls under the Minister of Interior. It also works closely with the Criminal Investigation Department (CID) and the military. The force was founded in 1993 out of the Somali National Movement (SNM) who liberated the country from the dictator Siyaad Bare's regime of Somalia after the long and bloody Somaliland War of Independence. It is divided according to each of Somaliland's administrative regions: Maroodi Jeex, Sahil, Awdal, Togdheer, Sanaag and Sool. Each region has a police commandant and commissioned officers. The police are tasked with carrying out criminal investigation, patrolling, and traffic management. There is also a small number of anti-riot personnel.  In addition, a British-trained Special Protection Unit (SPU) is tasked with the protection of leaders and foreign dignitaries. In 2005, the armed forces and the police received 15 percent of the Somaliland budget. Most of this money went to salaries and allowances.

The US State Department's 2010 Human Rights Reports in Somalia observed that the Somaliland Police were firmly under civilian control, had not committed any unlawful killings (including demonstrators), were not conducting arbitrarily or politically motivated arrests, and were not committing torture or rape (but were also not taking direction action against people who were). The report noted that the prisons were improving, due to UN supervision. Half of the 765 prisoners in Mandera Prison were detained on the orders of regional or district security committees.

The Somaliland Police commissioner is General Mohamed Adan Saqadhi. He replaced Abdillahi Fadal Iman. The Deputy Police Commissioner of Somaliland is Abdirahman Liban.

Departments

As of 2003, there were eight police stations and 24 police posts in Hargeisa.

Special Police Unit (SPU) and Criminal Investigation Department (CID). 
In spite of the Special Police Unite (SPU), the Somaliland government trained almost 70 soldiers as a Rapid Response Unit (RRU), finishing training for a second team, almost 100 soldiers, on March 14, 2013. The Rapid Response Unit is trained for emergency responses, including terrorism acts, firing, first aid, and protecting.

Since at least 2010, the UNDP has been working on reforming and training the Somaliland police force. In 2010 they were also making an effort to align/merge the maritime police with the civilian police.

Since December 2021 the UK government has been funding the Somaliland Security Programme, which includes developing the Police capability in strategic planning, public order, counter-terrorism and joint operations.

Line units
Due to lack of funds and an arms embargo on Somalia as a whole, the guns used by the Somaliland Police belong to the individual soldiers themselves. Before joining the army, both former combatants and new recruits, are required to report for an recruitment process with their guns. A similar process is observed in other disciplined forces, including the police.

Establishments
Mandera Academy.

Deployments
May 2008 - Simultaneous explosions in Hargeisa targeting the UNDP, the Somaliland Elections Commission, and the Ethiopian embassy, as well as Puntland administration offices in Bossasso, killed 20 persons and injured 37. On May 28, a Hargeisa regional court arraigned 11 suspects in the attack. In July the court acquitted nine of the suspects for lack of evidence and sentenced two others to a jail term of 18 months each for obstruction of justice. The court also delivered in absentia death sentences to five suspects who were on the run. On September 16, Somaliland security arrested after that freed by high court, one of the suspected masterminds who had already been sentenced to death by hanging; he remained in custody awaiting the implementation of this sentence.
September 2009 - Somaliland authorities arrested and detained more than 100 persons, including several opposition leaders, after four persons were killed during demonstrations in Hargeisa.
June 19, 2011 - Two "soldiers" killed in a bomb attack on a police station in Las Anod, Sool region.
October 27, 2011 - Police condemned by National Union of Somali Journalists (NUSOJ) for beating a journalist in Hargeisa in broad daylight, allegedly for taking several pictures.
November 27, 2011 - Commander of the Central Investigative Unit (CID) of Sool, Mohamud Mohamed Hirsi, is gunned down in Las Anod; his deputy, Arab Warsame, is also wounded.

General Commissioners

Firearms

Ranks 

Officers

Enlisted

References

External links 
 

1993 establishments in Somaliland
Crime in Somaliland
Law enforcement agencies in Africa
Organisations of the Somaliland Government